Life of Crime is a British television crime drama series first broadcast on ITV1 in May 2013. The three-part serial stars Hayley Atwell as Denise Woods, who tries to solve the murders of three seemingly connected victims across three decades, each of which she believes has been committed by the same offender, Mike Holland (Julian Lewis Jones). Declining ratings across the series resulted in a second run not being commissioned; the series was however received well by critics and viewers.

The complete series was released on DVD on 27 April 2015.

Plot
ITV's initial plotline of the series was as follows: "Denise Woods starts her career as an idealistic WPC, fighting sexism and ignoring her mother’s disappointment at her career choice. She’s seconded to work with handsome young plain clothes Detective Sergeant Ray Deans. One September morning, she accompanies him to a crime scene in a narrow lane behind a Brixton nightclub where the battered and strangled body of teenager Amy has been discovered. Having had a previous encounter with the teenager, Denise is determined to bring Amy’s killer to justice. She works against the clear instruction and advice of her senior officers and follows her own lines of enquiry. As the investigation progresses Denise’s fervour for the case leads her to fall foul of her senior officer, DCI Ferguson. But Denise stays single-minded in her pursuit of the killer and at that point makes her fateful decision."

Cast
 Hayley Atwell as WPC/DS/DI Denise Woods
 Richard Coyle as DS Ray Deans
 Julian Lewis Jones as Mike Holland
 Con O'Neill as DCI Ferguson
 Joel Beckett as DI Gainham
 Ray Panthaki as DS Nabeel Kothari
 Amanda Drew as Beverley Reid
 Lara Rossi as DC Jay Tomlin
 Ruth McCabe as Rose Woods

Episode list

References

External links
 

Fiction set in 1985
Fiction set in 1997
2013 British television series debuts
2013 British television series endings
2010s British drama television series
British crime drama television series
2010s British legal television series
2010s British television miniseries
English-language television shows
ITV television dramas
Murder in television
Rape in television
Television series by ITV Studios
Television series set in 1985
Television series set in 1997
Television series set in 2013
Television shows set in London
Television shows set in the Republic of Ireland
2010s British crime television series